"Soldier's Heart"  is a 2001 song  by R. Kelly. The song, written and produced by Kelly himself, is a tribute to the soldiers in America. It appeared on some European releases of "The World's Greatest" as a B-side. The song was later released as a single in 2003 and appeared on Second official compilation album called My Diary released in 2005, renamed "Front Line". Kelly donated all the proceeds from this song to the families of the American Soldiers. The song peaked at number 80 on the Billboard Hot 100 singles chart.

Music video
Kelly recorded two videos for this song, a music video and an AOL Live performance. The music video shows R. Kelly playing the piano and also singing in front of the American flag with Hart Hollman & The Motown Romance Orchestra.

Critical reception
The songs has received positive reviews from fans and critics alike.

Live performance
Kelly later performed this song live on The Arsenio Hall Show in 2013 as a tribute to the late Nelson Mandela.

Track listing

US CD single
 "Soldier's Heart"

Chart performance

References

Songs about soldiers
Songs about the military
2001 songs
2003 singles
R. Kelly songs
Songs written by R. Kelly
Charity singles
Song recordings produced by R. Kelly
Jive Records singles